Brad Benjamin (born September 21, 1986) is an American professional golfer.

Amateur career
Benjamin was born in Rockford, Illinois. He had a successful amateur career while at the University of Memphis. In his freshman year of 2006, he finished tied third in the Conference USA golf championships. The following year he won his first collegiate tournament. In summer 2009, following his graduation, he won the U.S. Amateur Public Links, qualifying him for the following year's Masters Tournament. He finished 3rd in the 2010 Sunnehanna Amateur, 2nd in the Northeast Amateur, and he finished T-9 in the 2010 U.S. Amateur at Chambers Bay. He came through qualifying for the 2011 U.S. Open, and was one of three amateurs to make the cut.

Benjamin turned professional in 2011 and qualified for PGA Tour Canada in 2016.

Amateur wins
2006 Greater Rockford Open
2007 Palisades Collegiate Classic
2009 U.S. Amateur Public Links

Professional wins
2009 Illinois Open (as an amateur)

Results in major championships

DNP = Did not play
CUT = missed the half-way cut

References

American male golfers
Memphis Tigers men's golfers
Golfers from Illinois
Sportspeople from Rockford, Illinois
1986 births
Living people